Whittaker is a surname of English origin, meaning 'white acre', and a given name. Variants include Whitaker and Whitacre. People with the name include:

Surname

A
Aaron Whittaker (born 1968), New Zealand rugby player
Al Whittaker (1918–2006), American business organizer
Alison Whittaker, Australian poet
Allien Whittaker (born 1983), Jamaican footballer
Andrew Whittaker (engineer) (born 1956), American engineer
Andy Whittaker, British film distributor
Anthony Whittaker (born 1968), American composer
Arnie Whittaker (1879–1955), English footballer

B
Ben Whittaker (born 1989), Australian rugby union footballer
Benjamin Whittaker (born 1997), English boxer
Bernard Whittaker (1865–??), English footballer
Bill Whittaker (disambiguation), multiple people
Bob Whittaker (born 1939), American politician
Brian Whittaker (1956–1997), Scottish footballer

C
Charles Whittaker (disambiguation), multiple people
Craig Whittaker (born 1962), British politician
Cynthia Whittaker (born 1942), American academic

D
Dale Whittaker (born 1961), American academic administrator
David Whittaker (disambiguation), multiple people
Desmond Whittaker (1925–1966), Indian cricketer
Dick Whittaker (1934–1998), Irish footballer

E
Edgar Whittaker, English footballer
Edwin Whittaker (1834–1880), English cricketer
Enos Whittaker (1888–1959), English footballer
Esmé Whittaker, British art historian
E. T. Whittaker (1873–1956), English mathematician

F
Fozzy Whittaker (born 1989), American football player
Frank Whittaker (1894–1961), Indian bishop
Fred Whittaker (disambiguation), multiple people

G
Gavin Whittaker (1970–2017), Australian rugby league footballer
Geoff Whittaker (1916–1997), English cricketer
Geoffrey Owen Whittaker (1932–2015), British civil servant
George Whittaker (disambiguation), multiple people

H
Harvey Whittaker (1875–1937), English footballer
Huey Whittaker (born 1981), American football player

I
Ian Whittaker (born 1928), British set designer
Ike Whittaker (born 1935), Australian footballer

J
Jace Whittaker (born 1995), American football player
Jack Whittaker (disambiguation), multiple people
James Whittaker (disambiguation), multiple people
Jason Whittaker (disambiguation), multiple people
Jeff Whittaker (born 1940), New Zealand politician
Jim Whittaker (born 1929), American mountaineer
Jodie Whittaker (born 1982), English actress
John Whittaker (disambiguation), multiple people
Johnson Chesnut Whittaker (1858–1931), American military student
Joseph Whittaker (1813–1894), English botanist

K
Kai Whittaker (born 1985), German politician

L
Leon Whittaker (born 1985), Caymanian footballer
Lou Whittaker (born 1929), American mountaineer

M
Maria Whittaker (born 1969), English glamour model
Mark Whittaker (born 1965), Australian journalist
Meredith Whittaker, American researcher
Michael Whittaker (disambiguation), multiple people
Morgan Whittaker (born 2001), English footballer

N
Neil Whittaker (born 1956), Australian rugby union footballer
Nicholas Whittaker (born 1953), British writer
Noel Whittaker (born 1940), Australian columnist

P
Paul Whittaker (born 1957), Australian cricketer
Paul Whittaker (newspaper editor), Australian newspaper editor
Patricia Whittaker, West Indian cricketer

R
Ray Whittaker (born 1945), English footballer
Rebecca Whittaker, Canadian politician
Red Whittaker (born 1948), American robot scientist
Robert Whittaker (disambiguation), multiple people
Roger Whittaker (born 1936), Kenyan-British singer-songwriter
Ron Whittaker (born 1971), American golfer

S
Sally Whittaker (born 1963), British soap opera actress
Sammy Whittaker (1888–1952), English footballer
Sandra Whittaker (born 1963), British sprinter
Sheelagh Whittaker (born 1947), Canadian business executive
Spen Whittaker (1871–1910), English football manager
Stanley Whittaker (born 1994), American basketball player
Stephen Whittaker (1947–2003), British actor and director
Steve Whittaker, American professor
Steven Whittaker (born 1984), Scottish footballer
Stuart Whittaker (born 1975) English football player

T
Thomas Whittaker (disambiguation), multiple people
Tony Whittaker (1932–2016), British politician
Trevor Whittaker (born 1942), English professor

V
Victor P. Whittaker (1919–2016), British biochemist

W
Walt Whittaker (1894–1965), American baseball player
Walter Whittaker (1878–1917), English footballer
William Whittaker (disambiguation), multiple people

Given name 
 Whittaker Chambers (1901–1961), American writer, witness in Alger Hiss espionage case

English-language surnames